Juan Gualberto Casco Bogarín (born 12 July 1945) is a Paraguayan retired footballer who played as a midfielder, primarily in Spain.

Career
Casco, who was described by Mundo Deportivo as quick and incisive in his play, spent five seasons in La Liga with Elche, scoring 25 goals in 97 official matches for the club. Casco scored twelve of the goals in the Copa del Rey, making him the club's third-highest scorer in that competition. He scored the deciding goal against Real Sociedad in the 1969 Copa del Generalísimo semi-final playoff, leading the club to the final – its highest profile moment. Casco played in the final, but was unable to prevent Athletic Bilbao from winning 1–0.

References

External links

1945 births
Living people
Paraguayan footballers
Elche CF players
Villarreal CF players
Real Murcia players
Albacete Balompié players
Association football midfielders
La Liga players
Segunda División players
Paraguayan expatriate footballers
Paraguayan expatriates in Spain
Expatriate footballers in Spain